Mernda railway station is the terminus of the suburban electrified Mernda line in Victoria, Australia. It serves the north-eastern Melbourne suburb of Mernda, and it opened on 26 August 2018.

History

The original Mernda station opened on 23 December 1889, when the railway line from Epping was extended to Whittlesea. It was originally named South Yan Yean, and was renamed Mernda on 1 December 1913.

Mernda operated until the closure of the line beyond Lalor on 29 November 1959, following the electrification of the line as far as Lalor. Epping was re-opened on 29 November 1964, with the electrification of that section of the line. The remaining section of track from Epping to Whittlesea was dismantled in the 1970s, although the former right-of-way remained intact. Prior to the rebuilding, all that remained of the former station was a degraded platform, which was overgrown with exotic vegetation, including a peppercorn tree. The station-master's house was believed to have been moved to the Findon Pony Club, and still serves as their clubrooms.

Restoration of the railway to Mernda was identified as a goal in the Strategic Transportation Study undertaken by the City of Whittlesea in 2002. The council has forecast that the population in Mernda and Doreen will be 40,000 by that time. The South Morang and Mernda Rail Alliance, which was successful in lobbying the state government to fulfill its promise of reinstating the rail line to South Morang, then lobbied the government to commit to reinstating the line to Mernda. In February 2016, the Victorian State Government announced the station would reopen in 2019.

The State Government announced funding in its 2016/17 State Budget to provide 8 km of duplicated track between South Morang and Mernda, a rebuilt station at Mernda with 1,000 car parking spaces, and an additional station to be built near Marymede Catholic College. On 26 August 2018, this extension opened.

Platforms and services

Mernda has one island platform with two faces. It is serviced by Metro Trains' Mernda line services.

Platform 1:
  all stations and limited express services to Flinders Street

Platform 2:
  all stations and limited express services to Flinders Street

Transport links

Dysons operates eight routes via Mernda station, under contract to Public Transport Victoria:
 : to Diamond Creek station
 : Whittlesea – Northland Shopping Centre
 : Whittlesea – Greensborough Plaza
 : to RMIT University Bundoora Campus
 : to RMIT University Bundoora Campus
 : to Mernda station (anti-clockwise loop via Doreen)
 : to Mernda station (clockwise loop via Doreen)
 : to Craigieburn station

Gallery

References

External links

Premium Melbourne railway stations
Railway stations in Australia opened in 1889
Railway stations closed in 1959
Railway stations in Melbourne
Railway stations in Australia opened in 2018
Railway stations in the City of Whittlesea